The People's Assembly of the Republic of Ingushetia is the regional parliament of Ingushetia, a federal subject of Russia. It consists of 32 deputies elected for five-year terms. Its presiding officer is the chairman.

Elections

2021

References

Sources
Official website of the People's Assembly of the Republic of Ingushetia

See also
List of chairmen of the People's Assembly of the Republic of Ingushetia

Politics of Ingushetia
Ingushetia
Ingushetia